David Cavanagh was an Irish writer and music journalist, best known for his the critically acclaimed 2000 book My Magpie Eyes Are Hungry for the Prize, which detailed the rise and fall of Creation Records, and for his editorship of Select magazine in the 1990s.

Cavanagh was born in Dublin, and grew up in Northern Ireland. During his career, he wrote for Sounds, Select, Q, Uncut and Mojo.

Cavanagh killed himself by jumping in front of a train in Luton in December 2018, aged 54.

Books by Cavanagh
The World's Greatest Rock 'n' Roll Scandals. Bounty, 1989. .
Love Is the Drug. Penguin, 1994. Edited by John Aizlewood. 
The Creation Records Story: My Magpie Eyes are Hungry for the Prize. Virgin, 2001. 
Music for Boys. Fourth Estate, 2003. 
1000 Songs to Change Your Life. Time Out, 2008. Edited by Will Fulford-Jones and John Lewis. 
Good Night and Good Riddance: How Thirty-Five Years of John Peel Helped to Shape Modern Life. Faber & Faber, 2015.

References

External links
Cavanagh's writing for Uncut

Year of birth missing
2018 suicides
Journalists from Northern Ireland
British music journalists
British writers
Mojo (magazine) people
Suicides by train
Suicides in England